This is a list of '''Rhode Island Rams football players in the NFL Draft.

Selections
Source:

References

Lists of National Football League draftees by college football team

Rhode Island Rams NFL Draft